Tilahun Gessesse (27 September 1940 – 19 April 2009) was an Ethiopian singer regarded as one of the most popular Ethiopian artist of the 20th century. Noted by his tenor voice, he was nicknamed "The Voice" during his country's "Golden Age" in the 1960s. Tilahun was an eminent singer whose works are attributed legacy to Ethiopian music. Besides his popularity, he raised money for aid during the famines of the 1970s and 1980s and earned the affection of the nation, being awarded a doctorate degree by the Addis Ababa University and also winning a lifetime achievement award from the Ethiopian Fine Art and Mass Media Prize Trust.

Tilahun died from diabetes on 19 April 2009 shortly after returning from the United States. His funeral took place in Addis Ababa at Holy Trinity Cathedral on 23 April with mass public figures and mourners gathered. Tilahun's work is often compared with Teddy Afro, who is also considered to have a huge impact on the Ethiopian music industry.

Life and career

Early years

Tilahun Gessesse was born to an Amhara father Gessesse Negusse, and an Oromo mother Gete Gurmu on 27 September 1940 in Addis Ababa. 

Tilahun attended the Ras Gobena Elementary school in Waliso where his grandfather lived. As time went by, his interest in music became increasingly clear, although his grandfather urged him to concentrate on his academic studies. The Ras Gobena School principal Shedad (who was from Sudan), encouraged Tilahun's interest in music and urged him to go to Sudan to pursue his music career. Although Tilahun did not go to Sudan, he took Shedad's advice very seriously. When Woizero Negatwa Kelkay, Eyoel Yohanes and other artists from the Hager Fikir Theatre came to his school to perform, Tilahun took the opportunity to discuss his interest in music with Eyoel. He was told to go to Addis Ababa if he wanted to pursue a career in the field. 

Tilahun dropped out of school and tried to travel to Addis Ababa to pursue his career, a journey he began on foot without his family's consent. Tilahun traveled fifteen kilometers on foot, he was caught in the small town of Tulu Bolo and stayed overnight with his aunt. The next day, he was forced to return to his grandfather in Waliso. Since his interest in music is perceived enthusiastic, Tilahun chose not to stay at his grandfather's house in Waliso. After staying only one night at his grandfather’s house, he again began his journey to Addis Ababa, this time hiding in the back of a loaded truck.

Achievements and career

In Addis Ababa, Tilahun was first hired by the Hager Fikir Association, which is now known as Hager Fikir Theatre. 
After a few years at the Hager Fikir Theater, he joined the Imperial Bodyguard Band where he became a leading star singer. During his time with the band, Tilahun came into conflict with the Ethiopian government after a attempted coup d'état in December 1960 by the Imperial Bodyguard. He was arrested and put in prison for some time.

Tilahun moved to the National Theater where his success continued. His tenor singing was regarded as the best Ethiopian pop voice of the 1960s. His popularity was such that he appeared three times in front of Emperor Haile Selassie I. During a visit, the Emperor advised him not to abuse his talent.

Recordings made by Tilahun during the 1970s and 1980s helped raise large sums of money to aid famine victims. The majority of his recordings were in Amharic, but he did also record a few in Oromo. In 1975, Tilahun released eponymous LP Tilahun Gessesse, Amha Records served as the label. With Ethio Grooves, Tilahun released Tilahun Gessesse Vol. 1/Vol. 2 in 1992 as a cassette release. The third version was released in the same year.

When collaborating with The Walias, they together worked to re-recording the older version of LPs since 1983 under Misrach Music Group.

Tilahun released his debut single "Yehagere Shita" in 1970, accompanied with 7", mono formats and Philp Philips served as the record label. With these formats, Tilahun continued to release singles and EPs, including "Tiz Alegn Yetintu" (1970), with Mulatu Astatke, "Kulun Manqualesh", "Min Libejegn" (1972), "Aykedashm Lebe" (1974), and "Yikir Yibelatchew / Leyito Blaskerew" (1974).

He received an Honorary Doctorate Degree from Addis Ababa University, in appreciation of his contribution to Ethiopian music. He also received an award for his lifetime achievements from the Ethiopian Fine Art and Mass Media Prize Trust.

Death and funeral
Tilahun died on 19 April 2009 in Addis Ababa as he was being taken to hospital by his wife. He had just returned to Ethiopia from the United States. He had been in poor health for several years due to diabetes. Ethiopian Prime Minister Meles Zenawi stated that "Tilahun stood out as an artist of great renown with his lifetime contributions to Ethiopia's modern music, which he popularized across the world". The Patriarch of the Ethiopian Orthodox Tewahedo Church, Abune Paulos said that "whoever is said dead is he who leave[s] nothing worthwhile behind. Tilahun left numerous, though secular, legacies behind to survive the mortal body for generations to come". As well as the United States Ambassador Donald Yamamoto stated that "Ethiopians owe a great deal to the late Tilahun Gessesse, who promoted Ethiopian music across the world".

A candlelit vigil was held by friends and family in the garden of the National Theatre in Addis Ababa on the night of 22 April 2009. On 23 April, a state funeral was held. About one million Ethiopians, including government officials, and entertainers, gathered in Meskel Square, Addis Ababa and heard messages of condolence from the prime minister and President Girma Wolde-Giorgis. A funeral mass was held in the Holy Trinity Cathedral. Messages of condolence from fans all over the world were posted on a memorial website.

Discography

Contributing artist
Éthiopiques Volume 17 – Buda Musique 82266-2 (2003)
The Rough Guide to the Music of Ethiopia – World Music Network (2004)

See also
Music of Ethiopia

References

Further reading
 Təlahun Gässäsä. Encyclopaedia Aethiopica, Siegbert Uhlig, (ed.), vol 4, pp. 911–912. Wiesbaden: Harrassowitz. 2010.

External links
BBC World Service tribute to Tilahun Gessesse
 Redressing the Disabuse of Tilahun Gessesse's Biography by the Abyssinian Corner

1940 births
2009 deaths
Deaths from diabetes
20th-century Ethiopian male singers
Musicians from Addis Ababa
Amharic-language singers
Oromo-language singers
People from Oromia Region
Oromo people
Buda Musique artists